The 2017–18 Ukrainian First League was the 27th since its establishment. The competition commenced on 14 July 2017 when Zhemchuzhyna Odesa hosted MFC Mykolaiv. After the completion of Round 22 on 18 November 2017, the competition entered a winter break and resumed the spring session on 18 March 2018 and complete the competition on 19 May 2018.

Teams 
On 21 June 2017, it was announced that 16 or 18 teams would play in the competition. This decision was dependent on the possible withdrawal of FC Stal Kamianske from the Premier League. Due to sanctions, FC Dnipro was relegated directly to the Second League which raised a discussion of a promotion possibly of another club to the First League. In addition in the case of the withdrawal of Stal, Desna had an opportunity to be accepted to the Ukrainian Premier League with another ongoing inter-season case (see Desna vs Veres promotion) leaving the First League with 16 participants. On 26 June 2017, FC Stal Kamianske chose to stay in the Premier League, while at same time FC Balkany Zorya was confirmed as the 18th participant of the First League season.

Promoted teams 
The following teams have been promoted from the 2016–17 Ukrainian Second League:
Zhemchuzhyna Odesa – winners (debut)
Rukh Vynnyky – runners-up (debut)
Kremin Kremenchuk – third place (returning for the first time since 1998–99 season)
Balkany Zorya – fourth place (debut)

Relegated teams 

The following team has been relegated from the 2016–17 Ukrainian Premier League:
Volyn Lutsk – 12th place (returning for the first time since 2009–10 season)

Location map 
The following displays the location of teams.

Stadiums 

The following stadiums are considered home grounds for the teams in the competition.

Managers

Managerial changes

League table

Results

Position by round

Promotion play-offs
Apart from a break in 2014, the post-season play-offs in the First League have been actively conducted since 2011. However, the promotion play-offs were reintroduced for the first time since the 2001–02 season. Teams that placed 10th and 11th in the 2017–18 Ukrainian Premier League play two-leg play-offs with the second and third teams of the 2017–18 Ukrainian First League. On 11 May 2018, a draw for play-offs took place in the House of Football, Kyiv. The games were played on 23 May and 27 May 2018.<ref>Levchenko, S. Referee appointments to the play-off matches for the right to play in Premier-Liha (Судейские назначения на матчи плей-офф за право играть в Премьер-лиге). Footboom. 21 May 2018</ref>

 Top goalscorers Notes:''

Awards

Round awards

The 2017 annual coaching laureates
The best coaches were identified by the All-Ukrainian Football Coaches Association.

Season awards
The laureates of the 2017–18 season were:
 Best player:  Denys Favorov (Desna Chernihiv)
 Best coach:  Anatoliy Bezsmertnyi (FC Poltava)
 Top goalscorer:  Oleksandr Akymenko (Inhulets Petrove)
 Fair Play award: Desna Chernihiv

See also 
 2017–18 Ukrainian First League Reserves
 2017–18 Ukrainian Premier League
 2017–18 Ukrainian Second League
 2017–18 Ukrainian Cup

References

External links 
 2017–18 Season regulations. Professional Football League of Ukraine and Football Federation of Ukraine

Ukrainian First League seasons
2017–18 in Ukrainian association football leagues
Ukraine